Ploce may refer to:

 Ploce (figure of speech)
 Ploče, a city in Croatia